Nicholas Tomsick (born 26 February 1991) is an American-Croatian professional basketball player who plays for KB Prishtina in the Kosovo Basketball Superleague, Balkan International Basketball League (BIBL) and the FIBA Europe Cup. In 2019, he led the Úrvalsdeild in assists while playing for Þór Þorlákshöfn. He became well known for his clutch performances in close games in the Úrvalsdeild, hitting several game winning shots at the buzzer for both Þór and Stjarnan.

College career
Tomsick played two seasons at North Platte Community College from 2010 to 2012. As a sophomore he led the NJCAA Region 9 and ranked third in the nation in scoring at 22.3 points per game and was named to the All-conference first team and All-NJCAA Region IX Tournament Team. In 2012, he transferred to Fort Lewis where he averaged 17.3 points in 57 games from 2012 to 2014.

Professional career
After starting his professional career in Germany with BBG Herford, Tomsick went on to play for KK Zabok, Plymouth Raiders and KK Vrijednosnice Osijek before signing with Þór Þorlákshöfn in the Úrvalsdeild karla in July 2018.

On 15 November 2018, Tomsick scored 41 points and made 8 three point shots, including a game winning buzzer beater, against Breiðablik. On 3 February 2019, Tomsick scored the game winning three point shot against ÍR.
Regarded as one of the best players in the league during the regular season, he averaged 22.9 points and led the league, tied with Ægir Steinarsson, with 7.5 assists per game. During the playoffs, he was a big catalyst in Þór's unexpected advance to the semi-finals where the team bowed out against eventual champions KR.

In July 2019, Tomsick signed with Stjarnan. Stjarnan opened the 2019–20 season with a 89–77 win against reigning champions KR in the annual Icelandic Super Cup where Tomsick posted 13 points and 6 assists. On 1 November, he scored a game winning buzzer beater against Njarðvík, giving Stjarnan 78–76 victory. On 20 November, Tomsick scored 44 points, include the game winning three pointer at the buzzer, in a 101–104 victory against Þór Akureyri. Tomsick, who battled illness during the game and threw up on the sideline during half-time, made 11 out of 17 three point shots during the game. On 15 February 2020, Tomsick scored 19 points in Stjarnan's 75–89 win against Grindavík in the Icelandic Cup finals. For the season he averaged a team leading 20.1 points along with 5.1 assists.

On 14 April 2020, Tomsick signed with Tindastóll, meeting his former Þór Þorlákshöfn coach Baldur Þór Ragnarsson.

References

External links
Icelandic statistics at Icelandic Basketball Association
RealGM profile
Eurobasket profile
Fort Lewis Skyhawks bio

1991 births
Living people
American men's basketball players
Basketball players from Colorado
Croatian men's basketball players
Fort Lewis Skyhawks men's basketball players
Plymouth Raiders players
Point guards
Stjarnan men's basketball players
Ungmennafélagið Tindastóll men's basketball players
Úrvalsdeild karla (basketball) players
KK Vrijednosnice Osijek players
KB Prishtina players
KK Zabok players